The Noah's Ark Trap is a chess opening trap in the Ruy Lopez. The term describe a family of traps in the Ruy Lopez in which a white bishop is trapped on the b3-square by black pawns.

Discussion
The origin of the name is uncertain. The shape of the black pawns on a6, b5, and c4 may resemble an ark, or the name may suggest that the trap is "as old as Noah's Ark".

Even chess masters have occasionally fallen victim to this trap. An example is a game between Endre Steiner and José Capablanca at the Budapest tournament in 1929:
1. e4 e5 2. Nf3 Nc6 3. Bb5 a6 4. Ba4 d6 5. d4
Better moves for White are 5.c3, 5.Bxc6+, and 5.0-0.

5... b5 6. Bb3 Nxd4 7. Nxd4 exd4 8. Qxd4
Alexander Alekhine recommended this move in the tournament book for New York 1924 as a means for White to draw, but it is a mistake that loses . White should instead play 8.Bd5 or try a gambit with 8.c3.

8... c5 9. Qd5 Be6 10. Qc6+ Bd7 11. Qd5 c4 (see diagram)
The white  is trapped. White resigned after 32 moves.

In the Sicilian

A variation of this trap can occur in the Sicilian Defence after the moves 
1. e4 c5 2. Nf3 Nc6 3. Bb5 
The Rossolimo Variation.

3... a6 4. Ba4??
4.Bxc6 is necessary and the point of 3.Bb5 itself.

4... b5 5. Bb3 c4 (see diagram) 

The bishop is again similarly trapped.

References

Chess traps
Noah's Ark in popular culture